El inocente ("The Innocent") is a 1956 Mexican film. It was written by Luis Alcoriza. After a quarrel with her boyfriend on New Year's Eve, Mane (Pinal) drives her car from Mexico City to 
Cuernavaca to meet her parents in their country house. The car breaks down in the highway and Mane has to ask for help. Mechanic Cruci (Infante) arrives and, after testing the car, offers Mane a ride on his motorcycle. Back in Mane's house, she invites him some drinks to celebrate New Year's Eve. They get drunk and, the morning after, Mane's parents arrive and find them sleeping together. Not knowing what happened, Mane and Cruci are forced to get married against their will.

References

External links
 

1956 films
Mexican musical comedy films
1950s Spanish-language films
1950s Mexican films
Mexican black-and-white films
1956 musical comedy films